Florence Eugene Baldwin (March 7, 1825 – November 3, 1886) was a member of the Minnesota State Senate, and was the first Recording Secretary and a founding member of Phi Alpha Literary Society.

Baldwin was born in Bethany, Pennsylvania.  He attended McKendree College, then moved to Illinois College in 1844. While at Illinois College he was a founding member of Phi Alpha Literary Society, and served on the three man committee that prepared its constitution. In 1851, he married Elizabeth Wilkinson, with whom he ultimately fathered 11 children. He was elected to the Minnesota State Senate on October 11, 1859 and served from 1859 to 1861.  He also served several terms as a county attorney. He died in St. Cloud, Minnesota.

References 

1825 births
1886 deaths
Minnesota state senators
People from Bethany, Pennsylvania
McKendree University alumni
Illinois College alumni
19th-century American politicians